The Brooklyn is one of five cocktails named for the boroughs of New York City, along with the Bronx, the Manhattan, the Queens and the Staten Island Ferry.  It resembles a Manhattan, but with a specific type of bitters (several types of bitters can be used in a Manhattan) and the addition of Maraschino liqueur.  It largely fell into obscurity after the end of Prohibition, but experienced a resurgence in the 1990s.

See also
 List of cocktails

References

Cocktails with whisky
Cocktails with vermouth
Cocktails with bitters
Cocktails with fruit liqueur